Marco Grüttner (born 17 October 1985) is a German former footballer who played as a striker.

Career

Grüttner began his career playing amateur football in Baden-Württemberg before joining SSV Ulm 1846 of the Regionalliga Süd in 2009. He spent half a season with the club before joining VfR Aalen of the same level, who he helped win the title and promotion to the 3. Liga. He made his debut at this level on 31 July 2010 as a substitute for Elia Soriano in a 2–1 defeat to TuS Koblenz, but he only scored once in eighteen appearances in the 2010–11 season.

In July 2011, Grüttner signed for Stuttgarter Kickers of the Regionalliga Süd, and he was the club's top scorer that season as they won the division. Grüttner finished as the third top scorer of the 2012–13 3. Liga with 18 goals as the Kickers survived relegation, finishing 17th.

On 1 July 2013, Grüttner moved to VfB Stuttgart II, and on 10 April 2013 he signed a contract that would keep with the team through June 2016.

In the 2016 summer transfer window, he joined SSV Jahn Regensburg. He was made captain of the team by coach Achim Beierlorzer at the start of the 2017–18 season. In August 2017, he agreed to a one-year contract extension with Regensburg, tying him to the club until summer 2019. In June 2018, his contract was extended by a further year. In November 2019, he decided to return to Baden-Württemberg at the end of the 2019–20 season.

In September 2018, he was awarded the Fair-Play-Medal by the DFB for the 2017–18 season.

Honours
VfR Aalen
 Regionalliga Süd: 2009–10

Stuttgarter Kickers
 Regionalliga Süd: 2011–12

References

External links
 

1985 births
Living people
German footballers
Footballers from Baden-Württemberg
SSV Ulm 1846 players
VfR Aalen players
Stuttgarter Kickers players
VfB Stuttgart II players
SG Sonnenhof Großaspach players
SSV Jahn Regensburg players
SGV Freiberg players
2. Bundesliga players
3. Liga players
Regionalliga players
Oberliga (football) players
Association football forwards